Geoffrey Butler (born 7 December 1995) is a freestyle swimmer from the Cayman Islands. Together with his sister Lara he competed at the 2014 and 2015 world championships and at the 2016 Summer Olympics. His best result was 41st place in the 1500 m in 2014.

References

1995 births
Living people
Olympic swimmers of the Cayman Islands
Swimmers at the 2016 Summer Olympics
Caymanian male freestyle swimmers